The Canadian Society of Landscape Architects (French:Association des architectes paysagistes du Canada; CSLA-AAPC) is the national organization representing 1600 landscape architects in Canada's ten provinces and three territories. The organization was founded in 1934. Its mission is to "advance the art, science and business of landscape architecture."

One of the founding members was Lorrie Dunington-Grubb, co-founder with her husband Howard of the Sheridan Nurseries. In 1944 she became president of the society.

Members of the College of Fellows 
 Cornelia Oberlander
 Don Vaughan (landscape architect)
 Peter Jacobs (landscape architect)
 Janet Rosenberg

References

External links 
Canadian Society of Landscape Architects Official Site - English
Canadian Society of Landscape Architects Official Site - Francais
Architecture associations based in Canada
Landscape architecture organizations
1934 establishments in Canada
Organizations established in 1934